Dr. Pan Pey-chyou (born 9 November 1955) is a Hong Kong politician and psychiatrist.

Early life 
Pan Pey-chyou was born in Taipei, Taiwan on 9 November 1955. He emigrated with his family first to Singapore at the age of three, and then to Hong Kong at six. He spoke Mandarin Chinese as a native language.

In politics
Pan served as a member of the Legislative Council of Hong Kong representing the Labour functional constituency from 2008 to 2001. He is the vice-chairman of the Hong Kong Federation of Trade Unions. He is also a member of the Democratic Alliance for the Betterment and Progress of Hong Kong.

Medical career
Pan graduated from the University of Hong Kong with an MBBS degree and works as a doctor at the psychiatry department of the United Christian Hospital in Kwun Tong, Kowloon.

He is an Honorary Clinical Associate Professor of Psychiatry Department of the Chinese University of Hong Kong.

References

1955 births
Living people
Academic staff of the Chinese University of Hong Kong
Hong Kong Federation of Trade Unions
Alumni of the University of Hong Kong
Hong Kong trade unionists
Democratic Alliance for the Betterment and Progress of Hong Kong politicians
HK LegCo Members 2008–2012
Members of the Election Committee of Hong Kong, 2007–2012
Members of the Election Committee of Hong Kong, 2017–2021
Members of the Election Committee of Hong Kong, 2021–2026
Recipients of the Bronze Bauhinia Star
Chinese psychiatrists